Aleksandr Georgiyevich Kostin (born 3 September 1969) is a former Russian professional footballer.

Club career
He made his professional debut in the Soviet Second League in 1986 for FC Nart Cherkessk. He played 2 games in the UEFA Cup 1993–94 for FC Spartak Vladikavkaz.

References

1969 births
People from Cherkessk
Living people
Soviet footballers
Russian footballers
Russian Premier League players
Veikkausliiga players
FC Dynamo Stavropol players
FC Dynamo Moscow players
FC Baltika Kaliningrad players
FC Spartak Vladikavkaz players
Tampere United players
PFC Spartak Nalchik players
Russian expatriate footballers
Expatriate footballers in Finland
FC Ilves players
Association football midfielders
Sportspeople from Karachay-Cherkessia